Luxembourg competed at the 1968 Summer Olympics in Mexico City, Mexico. Five competitors, three men and two women, took part in seven events in five sports.

Athletics

Men
Track and road events

Cycling

One cyclists represented Luxembourg in 1968.

Individual road race
 Roger Gilson — 5:05:12.29 hrs (→ 54th place)

Fencing

One fencer, a woman, represented Luxembourg in 1968.

Women's foil
 Colette Flesch — defeated in first round

Shooting

One shooter represented Luxembourg in 1968.

Men's 50 m pistol
 Nico Klein — 543 pts (→ 30th place)

Swimming

Women's 100 metres breaststroke
 Arlette Wilmes
 Heats — 1:24.4 min (→ 6th in heat, did not advance)

Women's 200 metres breaststroke
 Arlette Wilmes
 Heats — 3:06.7 min (→ 6th in heat, did not advance)

References

External links
Official Olympic Reports
Part Three: Results

Nations at the 1968 Summer Olympics
1968
1968 in Luxembourgian sport